"Idioter" is a song by the Swedish alternative rock band Kent. It was released as the third and final single from the band's eight studio album, Röd, digitally on 8 March 2010, and physically on 10 March. The single contains a single and a demo version of "Idioter", a remix of "Taxmannen" by Andreas Tilliander, and the song "Ensamheten" with remixes by Andrea Parker and Erase.

"Idioter" peaked at number thirty-three in Sweden, the band's lowest chart position since "Halka", which peaked at number thirty-six in 1996.

Track listing

Charts

References

Kent (band) songs
2010 singles
Song recordings produced by Joshua (record producer)
Songs written by Joakim Berg
Songs written by Martin Sköld
2009 songs